YMCA Camp Lakeside is located at village Nilshi, in the Western Ghats (mountains) between Mumbai and Pune, India.

Camp Lakeside is a 40-acre campsite surrounded by the beautiful Andhra Lake. The site aims to provide camping & outdoor experiences that develop self-reliance and resourcefulness in a fun, learning environment.

This wilderness retreat is used by outdoor development experts for environmental education and adventure sports, for corporate executive training, youth leadership building and conference programs, for summer and Diwali camp programs, by social workers for informal education of local under-privileged children, and for spiritual retreats.

Activities include: Rock climbing, archery, swimming, nature treks, development games, treasure hunts, rappelling, kayaking, ropes course, camp fires etc.

Design
The complex was designed by Pune-based Master Architect Prof.Christopher Charles Benninger. His team included architects Deepak Guggari and Harsh Manrao. This organic complex was completed in 2003 and has won national awards, including the 2006 Indian Institute of Architects (IIA) Award for the best Public Building of the year because of its sustainable environment and unique relationship to the landscape.

Most of the habitable areas are underground, tucked into the hillside, reducing the need for energy-driven air conditioning, while maintaining the original green ground coverage. Wind scopes provide natural ventilation and lighting deep within the habitable areas. Earth insulation reduces energy consumption and stabilizes cyclical temperature variations. The complex is one of India's best examples of energy efficient and sustainable architecture. It is also known for the use of a lightweight tensile structure over the dining hall providing soft, energy-free light. A recent addition is an underground conference hall that accommodates up to 80 people.

References

Indian Architect and Builder, October, 2006.
The Indian Express, Pune, December 27, 2006
Mid Day, January, 2007
Journal of the Indian Institute of Architects, January, 2007.

External links
Website

Summer programmes in India
Adventure tourism in India
Buildings and structures in Maharashtra
Sustainable buildings and structures